are located in the town of Tateyama, Toyama Prefecture, Japan. Shōmyō-daki is the highest waterfall in Japan at 350 m (1,148 ft). The falls have four stages: the first 70 m, the second 58 m, the third 96 m and the last 126 m high. The greatest amount of water flows over the falls in the early mid summer, when the snow in the Tateyama Mountains melts.

Its neighbor, Hannoki Falls, is usually considered the seasonably tallest, as it only has water from April to July when the snow on Midagahara plateau melts. As seen in the photo, Hannoki and Shōmyō falls are twin waterfalls.

References

Landforms of Toyama Prefecture
Waterfalls of Japan
Tateyama, Toyama